Lindsay Renwick (born 24 December 1960) is a former Scotland international rugby union player.

Rugby Union career

Amateur career

He started with Stirling County.

He then played for London Scottish.

He also played for Sale.

Provincial career

Renwick was capped by Scottish Exiles in the Scottish Inter-District Championship.

He played for Combined Scottish Districts on 1 March 1986 against South of Scotland, coming on as a replacement for Scott Hastings.

International career

Renwick was capped for Scotland 'B' 4 times between 1987 and 1989.

He earned a solitary full senior cap for Scotland, playing against Romania on the 9 December 1989.

Coaching career

He was an Assistant Coach at North Berwick in 2015.

Business career

He is now a non-executive director at Enjoy Leisure in East Lothian; and the Head of Customer Operations for Edinburgh Leisure.

References

1960 births
Living people
Scottish rugby union players
Scotland international rugby union players
Scotland 'B' international rugby union players
London Scottish F.C. players
Scottish Exiles (rugby union) players
Stirling County RFC players
Rugby union players from Hawick
Rugby union wings
Scottish Districts (combined) players